The Menik Ganga is the thirteenth-longest river of Sri Lanka. It runs across two provinces and two districts. 

Its catchment area receives approximately 2,124 million cubic metres of rain per year, and approximately 10 percent of the water reaches the sea. It has a catchment area of 1,272 square kilometres.

References 

Bodies of water of Hambantota District
Bodies of water of Monaragala District
Rivers of Sri Lanka